The Jequitinhonha River flows mainly through the Brazilian state of Minas Gerais. The main tributaries are the Araçuaí River, Piauí, São Miguel, Itacambiruçu, Salinas, São Pedro, and São Francisco.

The valley of the Jequitinhonha is one of the poorest regions of Brazil and is still prone to endemic yellow fever. The most populous of these is Almenara (36,254 in 2004) located on the middle Jequitinhonha.

The valley is known for its variety of gemstones, colonial-era towns, unique handicrafts and starkly beautiful landscapes immortalized by the Brazilian author João Guimarães Rosa.

Most of the soil is arid and is periodically affected by drought or floods. The economically active population numbers over 400,000, of which 180,000 are in the rural areas practicing rudimentary agriculture and cattle raising. Industry employs 50,000 people and is the most important economic source for the municipalities.

In the past the region was covered by forests and occupied by indigenous people. What contributed to the deforestation and subsequent degradation of the region was the predatory activity of mining and extraction of diamonds.

Today there are attempts to develop the work of local artisans, especially in ceramics. While living in total isolation, they have developed ceramic craftwork that is mainly performed by the women, who belong to associations. They make utilitarian pieces that are ranked as the most creative works of Brazilian popular art. The famous "dolls" from that region are in fact pitchers for holding fresh water, thus losing this function and becoming decorative objects.

The electrical company of Minas Gerais (CEMIG) constructed a hydroelectric plant on the river between Berilo and Grão Mogol. The Usina Presidente Juscelino Kubitscheck, the hydroelectric plant powered by Irapé Dam, has an installed capacity of 360 MW and regulates the waters of the river which periodically flood. CEMIG began the work in 2002 and in April 2003 diverted the river to two tunnels with a length of more than 1.2 km (three-quarters of a mile). The dam and power station were completed in 2006.

See also
 List of rivers of Bahia

External links
Photos of the Jequitinhonha
Map of Doce and Jequitinhonha Rivers Copied from Documents Found in the House of Representatives from the 19th century

Rivers of Bahia
Rivers of Minas Gerais